Aplagiognathus hybostoma is a species of longhorn beetle in the genus Aplagiognathus. It is endemic to Guatemala and Honduras.

References 

Prioninae
Beetles described in 1879